The Sharon Mosque is a mosque located in Sharon, Massachusetts, United States.

History 
The mosque was founded in 1993 as an extension of the Islamic Center of New England (ICNE) which was established by Lebanese American immigrants in Quincy, Massachusetts. The mosque is situated on 55 acres formerly used for a horse farm. The main building is a social hall large enough to accommodate 500 people.

School 
The second building behind the mosque houses an Islamic elementary school, Al Noor School, and weekend school. Former president of the school, Abdul Badi Abousamra was a prominent Boston doctor, Muslim activist, and father of Ahmad Abousamra, who is on the FBI Most Wanted Terrorists list.

Imams
Talal Eid was the first Imam of the Sharon mosque as well as the sister mosque in Quincy. Eid left ICNE in 2005 after creeping radicalism put him increasingly at odds in the late 1990s with the board of directors. 

In 1998, Muhammad Masood became Imam of the Sharon Mosque. In November 2006, he was detained by federal immigration agents for visa violations. In August 2007, he was arrested on criminal visa fraud charges. He pled guilty to five counts of visa fraud and volunteered for deportation in February 2008. After leaving the country, he became spokesman for the Pakistani terrorist organization Jamaat-ud-Dawah.

Interim Imam and Egyptian native, Khalid Nasr, was Imam of both Sharon and Quincy Mosques. After a difficult search, Abdur Rahman Ahmad, became the new Imam in 2015.
 1993-1998: Talal Eid
 1998-2006: Muhammad Masood
 2006-2015: Khalid Nasr
 2015-current: Abdur Rahman Ahmad

See also
  List of mosques in the Americas
  Lists of mosques 
  List of mosques in the United States

References

External links 
 Controversies around the Sharon Mosque,   from the Boston Globe 

Buildings and structures in Norfolk County, Massachusetts
Lebanese-American culture in Massachusetts
Mosques in Massachusetts
Sharon, Massachusetts
1993 establishments in Massachusetts